The Northern Line is a railway line in Thailand, running between the capital Bangkok (at Krung Thep Aphiwat Central Terminal) and the northern city of Chiang Mai (Chiang Mai railway station). The line first opened in 1896. Major cities served by the line include Bangkok, Ayutthaya, Nakhon Sawan, Phitsanulok, Lampang, and Chiang Mai. 

The line's operations were severely affected during World War II.

Since January 2023, long-distance (Special Express, Express and Rapid) trains terminated at Krung Thep Aphiwat Central Terminal in Bangkok instead of Hua Lamphong station.

History

Timeline

Name changes

Infrastructure

The Northern Line is entirely single track, except at stations. Track gauge is  meter gauge. As the train frequency increases, it is becoming increasingly challenging to operate trains running both direction on the single-line track. Double-tracking has commenced between Lop Buri and Pak Nam Pho, and is planned for the rest of the line. 

The Northern Line is not electrified. Regular services run on diesel power.

Stations

Tunnels

See also
 Rail transport in Thailand
 Lopburi Line: railway line of the Greater Bangkok commuter rail
 Northeastern Line (Thailand)
 Eastern Line (Thailand)
 Southern Line (Thailand)

References

Railway lines opened in 1896
Railway lines in Thailand
Metre gauge railways in Thailand